Tracy Davidson (born June 10) is a news presenter for WCAU in Philadelphia, Pennsylvania. She co-anchors NBC 10  News, weekdays at 4 p.m. and 6 p.m.

She has been with the station since 1996 when she was brought in to present the weekend morning news. In 1999, Davidson won a Mid-Atlantic Emmy Award in the "Outstanding Service News" category for her reporting work.  She won another as a presenter/reporter in 2001, in the "Outstanding Community Outreach Program" category. She has won 6 Emmy Awards total - most recently in 2013.

Davidson attended State University of New York at Geneseo and graduated from Temple University.

References

Television anchors from Philadelphia
Philadelphia television reporters
American television journalists
Living people
1963 births